Christophe Richer de Thorigny (1514?–1552/53) was valet de chambre to Francis I, a secretary to Cardinal Antoine Duprat, and a French ambassador of the 16th century. He was born in Thorigny-sur-Oreuse (to day, Yonne departement) Thorigny. His father, and his brother Nicolas was notary. His oldest brother, Jean Richer (+1569), was president of the presidial of Sens (Yonne), friend of Joachim Du Bellay, and Andre, another  brother, monk of the Vauluisant abbey, was bishop of Chalcedonia (+1555). He was ambassador to Scandinavia and Germany.

In the 1530s, Christophe Richer was sent by Francis I to Constantinople. In 1540 he published a study of the Ottoman civilization, De rebus Turcarum, also published in French that same year under the title Des Coustumes et manières de vivre des Turcs.

In 1541, Francis I sent Christophe Richer to Denmark and Sweden, the first official French embassy to a Protestant state. Richer was French ambassador to Denmark in 1547.

Works
De rebus Turcarum ad Franciscum Gallorum regem Christianiss by Christophe Richer 
Des Coustumes et manières de vivre des Turcs by Christophe Richer 

Some authors had been considered his work about the Fall of Constantinople as an account of an eyewitness (certain unknown Riccherio), but it was later discovered that it was actually Christophe Richer who composed his testimony of this event based on the work of several historians, such as Egnatius Cipelli, Flavio Biondo, Bartolomeo Platina, Michele Ricci, Robert Gaugin, Paolo Giovio and Andrea Cambini.

See also
Franco-Ottoman alliance

References

External links
 

16th-century male writers
16th-century French diplomats
16th-century French historians
16th-century French poets
1510s births
1550s deaths
Ambassadors of France to Denmark
Ambassadors of France to Sweden
French male non-fiction writers